In the North Korean government, the Cabinet is the administrative and executive body. The North Korean government consists of three branches: administrative, legislative, and judicial. However, they are not independent of each other, but all branches are under the exclusive political leadership of the Workers' Party of Korea (WPK).

Institutions
The leader must work through various agents and their institutions, which has the power to delay, modify, or even resist the leader's orders. These institutions may set the overall tone and direction for North Korea's foreign and domestic policy, make suggestions, offer policy options, and lobby Kim himself.

The government is also confirmed by the Supreme People's Assembly (SPA). The Premier, who appoints three Vice Premiers and the government's ministers, heads the cabinet. The government is dominated by the ruling Workers' Party of Korea (WPK) and has been since North Korea's inception in 1948.

The Cabinet now has the right to supervise and control the Local People's Committee (LPC,지방인민위원회) with regard to local economies and administration. As the State Administrative Council (SAC,정무원) was replaced by the Cabinet, the Local Administrative and Economic Committee (LAEC,지방행정경제위원회) was abolished and its functions regarding local politics transferred to the LPC. Under WPK former General Secretary Kim Jong-il, the cabinet's power was elevated to equal status with Workers' Party of Korea and Korean People's Army Ground Force (KPA).

A party chief secretary no longer concurrently holds the post of LPC chairman, which has been taken over by a former LAEC chairman. Thus, the LPC is theoretically independent of the local party and is under the control of the Cabinet. The status of the LPC as the local executive organ, in principle, became higher than before.

The Economist Intelligence Unit listed North Korea in last place as an authoritarian regime in its 2012 Democracy Index assessing 168 countries.

Judiciary

North Korea's judiciary is headed by the Central Court, which consists of a Chief Justice(판사) and two People's Assessors(인민참심원); three judges may be present in some cases.  Their terms of office coincide with those of the members of the Supreme People's Assembly. Every court in North Korea has the same composition as the Central Court. The judicial system is theoretically held accountable to the SPA and the Presidium of the SPA when the legislature is not in session.

The judiciary does not practice judicial review. The security forces so often interfere with the actions of the judiciary that the conclusion of most cases is foregone; experts outside North Korea and numerous defectors confirm this to be a widespread problem. Freedom House states that, "North Korea does not have an independent judiciary and does not acknowledge individual rights...reports of arbitrary detentions, 'disappearances,' and extrajudicial killings are common; torture is widespread and severe".

North Korea's fifth and current constitution was approved and adopted in September 1998, replacing the one previously adopted in 1972. The former constitution had last been amended in 1992. Under the new constitution, North Korea is a socialist state representing the interests of all the Korean people. Criminal penalties can be stiff; one of the basic functions of the system is to uphold the power of the regime. Because so little information is available concerning what actually occurs inside of the country, the extent to which there is any rule of law is uncertain. In any case, North Korea is known for its poor human rights situation and regularly detains thousands of dissidents without trial or benefit of legal advice. According to a US Department of State report on human rights practices, the government of North Korea often punishes the family of a criminal along with the perpetrator.

Workers' Party of Korea

The Workers' Party of Korea is organized according to the Monolithic Ideological System and the Great Leader, a system and theory conceived by Kim Yong-ju and Kim Jong-il. The highest body of the WPK is formally the Congress, which last convened as the 7th Congress of the Workers' Party of Korea in May 2016. Although the WPK is (in theory) organizationally similar to communist parties, in practice it is far less institutionalized and informal politics plays a larger role than usual. Institutions such as the Central Committee, the Secretariat, the Central Military Commission (CMC), the Politburo and the Presidium have much less power than that formally bestowed on them by the party's charter. Kim Jong-un is the current General Secretary of the WPK.

Relatively compared with other institutions of North Korea, the WPK remains to be the most ideological and views itself as the defender of the revolutionary way by emphasizing sovereignty and nationalism, as well as its commitment to a socialist ideology. Therefore, in theory, the WPK opposes accommodation and economic reform of any type.

 General Secretary of the Workers' Party of Korea: Kim Jong-un
 Chairman of the Central Military Commission of the Workers' Party of Korea: Kim Jong-un

State Affairs Commission

In June 2010, Kim Jong-il appointed his uncle (by marriage), Chang Sung-taek, as vice-chairman of the National Defence Commission, in a move seen as propping up his own position. Chang was already regarded as the second-most powerful person in North Korea and his appointment strengthened the probability that Kim's third son, Kim Jong-un, would succeed him. However, in December 2013 Chang was fired from all government posts and subsequently executed. Kim Jong-un ordered the execution.

In June 2016, following the 7th WPK Conference, the Constitution of North Korea was updated, replacing the National Defence Commission with the State Affairs Commission and placing Kim Jong-un as the Chairman of the State Affairs Commission. This places Kim Jong-un as the official head of state.
 Minister of People's Security: Choe Pu-il
 Minister of People's Armed Forces: Pak Yong-sik

Party leaders

General Secretary
Kim Jong-un

Presidium of the Political Bureau
Kim Jong-un, Choe Ryong-hae, Pak Pong-ju, Kim Yong-nam (to April 2019), Hwang Pyong-so (to 2018)

Members of the Political Bureau
Kim Jong-un, Kim Yong-nam, Hwang Pyong-so, Pak Pong-ju, Choe Ryong-hae, Kim Ki-nam, Choe Thae-bok, Ri Su-yong, Kim Phyong-hae, O Su-yong, Kwak Pom-gi, Kim Yong-chol, Ri Man-gon, Yang Hyong-sop, Ro Tu-chol, Pak Yong-sik, Ri Myong-su, Kim Won-hong and Choe Pu-il and Ri Yong-ho (Ocstober 2017), Kim Jae-ryong (April 2019)

Alternate members of the Political Bureau
Kim Su-gil, Kim Nung-o, Pak Thae-song, Ri Yong-ho, Im Chol-ung, Jo Yon-jun, Ri Pyong-chol, No Kwang-chol and Ri Yong-gil, and Kim Yo-jong, Kim Jong-sik, Ri Pyong-chol (October 2017)

Secretairat of the Central Committee
Secretary: Choe Ryong-hae, Kim Ki-nam, Choe Thae-bok, Ri Su-yong, Kim Phyong-hae, O Su-yong, Kwak Pom-gi, Kim Yong-chol and Ri Man-gon

Central Military Commission
Chairman: Kim Jong-un
Members: Hwang Pyong-so, Pak Pong-ju, Pak Yong-sik, Ri Myong-su, Kim Yong-chol, Ri Man-gon, Kim Won-hong, Choe Pu-il, Kim Kyong-ok, Ri Yong-gil and So Hong-chan

Department of the Central Committee
Directors: Kim Ki-nam, Ri Su-yong, Kim Phyong-hae, O Su-yong, Kim Yong-chol, Ri Man-gon, Ri Il-hwan, An Jong-su, Ri Chol-man, Choe Sang-gon, Ri Yong-rae, Kim Jong-im, Kim Jung-hyop, Kim Man-song and Kim Yong-su

Control Commission of the Central Committee
Chairman: Hong In-bom

State leaders

State Affairs Commission of DPRK
Members of the State Affairs Commission of North Korea are as follows:
 President: Kim Jong-un
 First Vice President of the State Affairs Commission: Choe Ryong-hae
Members of the commission:
Kim Tok-hun, Premier
 Ri Il-hwan, WPK Vice Chairman for Propaganda
 General of the Army Ri Yong-gil, Minister of the People's Armed Forces
 Ri Son-gwon, WPK Vice Chairman for International Relations
 Kim Yong-chol, WPK Vice Chairman for United Front Work
 Jong Kyong-thaek, Minister of State Security
 Ri Pyong-chol, Vice Chairman of the CMC, top advisor of Supreme Leader Kim Jong-un
 General of the Army Ri Yong-gil, Minister of Public Security
 Kim Yong-jae, External Economic Relations (Foreign Trade)
 Kim Yo-jong, Deputy Department Director of the Publicity and Information Department

Presidium of the SPA of the DPRK
The Presidium of the SPA is as follows:
President: Choe Ryong-hae
Vice presidents: Yang Hyong-sop and Kim Yong-dae
Honorary vice-president: Kim Yong-ju, and Choe Yong-rim (since April 2013)
Secretary general of the Presidium: Hong Son-ok (since April 2013)

Supreme People's Assembly
The chairman and vice-chairpersons of the Supreme People's Assembly are:
Chairman: Pak Thae-song
Vice-chairpersons: An Tong-chun and Ri Hye-jong (April 2014)

Cabinet
Some ministers of the Cabinet of North Korea are as follows:
Premier: Kim Jae-ryong (April 2019)
Vice Premiers: Ro Tu-chol (from April 2009), Ri Mu-yong (April 2014), Kim Yong Jin (April 2014), Ri Chol-man (since April 2012), Kim Tok-hun (April 2014)
Minister of Foreign Affairs: Ri Son-gwon (21 January 2020)
Minister of Finance: Choe Kwang-jin

See also

Politics of North Korea
Government of South Korea
State General Bureau of Tourist Guidance

Notes

External links
  
 

 
Politics of North Korea